Eve Knew Her Apples is a 1945 musical comedy remake of the 1934 film It Happened One Night directed by Will Jason and starring Ann Miller.  The movie was produced by Columbia Pictures, owner of the rights to the original 1934 version, and would be remade as a musical comedy again in 1956 as You Can't Run Away from It with June Allyson and Jack Lemmon.

Cast
Ann Miller as Eve Porter
William Wright as Ward Williams
Robert Williams as Steve Ormond
Ray Walker as George McGrew
Charles D. Brown as Joe Gordon
Minta Durfee as Landlady (uncredited)

References

External links
 Eve Knew Her Apples in the Internet Movie Database
 Eve Knew Her Apples at Turner Classic Movies
 Eve Knew Her Apples at The New York Times 
 Eve Knew Her Apples in Answers.com

1945 films
1945 musical comedy films
1945 romantic comedy films
American musical comedy films
American romantic comedy films
American romantic musical films
American screwball comedy films
Columbia Pictures films
1940s romantic musical films
Films directed by Will Jason
American black-and-white films
1940s American films